Kozuch or Kožuch is a surname meaning "fur coat" in Slovak and Polish. Notable people with the surname include:

Margareta Kozuch (born 1986), German volleyball player
Vladimír Kožuch (born 1975), Slovak football striker

See also
 

Polish-language surnames
Slovak-language surnames